57th National Board of Review Awards

Best Picture: 
 The Color Purple 
The 57th National Board of Review Awards were announced on December 16, 1985, and given on January 27, 1986.

Top 10 films
The Color Purple
Out of Africa *Academy Award for Best Picture*
The Trip to Bountiful
Witness
Kiss of the Spider Woman
Prizzi's Honor
Back to the Future
The Shooting Party
Blood Simple
Dreamchild

Top Foreign Films
Ran
The Official Story
When Father Was Away on Business
La Chèvre
The Home and the World

Winners
Best Picture: 
The Color Purple
Best Foreign Language Film:
Ran
Best Actor:
Raúl Juliá and William Hurt - Kiss of the Spider Woman
Best Actress:
Whoopi Goldberg - The Color Purple
Best Supporting Actor:
Klaus Maria Brandauer - Out of Africa
Best Supporting Actress:
Anjelica Huston - Prizzi's Honor
Best Director:
Akira Kurosawa - Ran
Career Achievement Award:
Orson Welles

External links
National Board of Review of Motion Pictures :: Awards for 1985

1985
1985 film awards
1985 in American cinema